Eugenie Glacier is a glacier on central Ellesmere Island, Nunavut, Canada.

See also
List of glaciers

References

Glaciers of Qikiqtaaluk Region
Ellesmere Island
Arctic Cordillera